Pardon is a given name and a surname. It may refer to:

Given name

 Pardon Ndhlovu (born 1987), Zimbabwean marathon runner 
 Pardon Tillinghast (1625–1718), early settler from England of Providence, Rhode Island, merchant, public official and pastor
 Pardon E. Tillinghast (1836–1905), American politician and Chief Justice of the Rhode Island Supreme Court

surname

 Billy Pardon (1903–1969), Australian rules footballer 
 Charles Pardon (1850-1890), British sportswriter
 Dererk Pardon (born 1996), American basketball player for Hapoel Be'er Sheva of the Israeli Basketball Premier League
 John Pardon (born 1989), American mathematician 
 Jorge Pardon (1905–1977), Peruvian footballer
 Lisa Pardon (born 1982), New Zealand basketball player
 Noël Pardon (1854–1910), French colonial administrator
 Sydney Pardon (1855–1925), British sports journalist, brother of Charles Pardon